The Rural Municipality of Elmsthorpe No. 100 is a rural municipality (RM) in the Canadian province of Saskatchewan within Census Division No. 2 and  Division No. 2. It is located in the southeast portion of the province.

History 
The RM of Elmsthorpe No. 100 incorporated as a rural municipality on December 12, 1910.

Heritage properties
There are four historical properties located within the RM.

Claybank Brick Plant - Constructed in 1912 - 1914, and located within Claybank the plant is now a national historic site. The plant previously operated under the name Saskatchewan Clay Products; Dominion Fire Brick and Pottery Company; Dominion Fire Brick and  Clay Products Ltd.; A.P. Green Refectories Ltd.
Crystal Hill School (now called the Crystal Hill Community Centre) - Constructed in 1930 as a one room school the building served as a school from 1930 until 1954.  The building is based on a Waterman-Waterbury Company design.
Saskatchewan Wheat Pool Elevator #292 - Constructed in 1964, and located within the hamlet of Truax.
St. Joseph's Roman Catholic Church - Constructed in 1928, and located within the hamlet of Claybank.

Geography 
Geographical features in the RM include the Dirt Hills, Watson Reservoir, Avonlea Badlands, and Avonlea Creek.

Communities and localities 
The following urban municipalities are surrounded by the RM.

Villages
 Avonlea

The following unincorporated communities are within the RM.

Organized hamlets
 Claybank

Localities
 Gravelbourg Junction
 Truax (dissolved as a village, December 30, 1970)

Demographics 

Economy 
Agriculture is its major industry.

Government 
The RM of Elmsthorpe No. 100 is governed by an elected municipal council and an appointed administrator that meets on the first Wednesday of every month. The reeve of the RM is Ken Miller while its administrator is Jaimie Paranuik. The RM's office is located in Avonlea.

References 

E

Division No. 2, Saskatchewan